Trenary may refer to:

 Mathias Township, Michigan, United States
 Cassandra Trenary, American ballet dancer
 Jill Trenary, American ice skater
 Philip Trenary (1954–2018), American businessman